Bałtów can refer to two villages in Poland:

Bałtów, Lublin Voivodeship (eastern Poland)
Bałtów, Świętokrzyskie Voivodeship (southeastern Poland)